= LoftLife (magazine) =

- Categories: Shelter and design
- Frequency: Quarterly
- Circulation: 208000
- Publisher: Joe Resudek
- First issue: May 2008
- Company: Modern Holdings
- Country: United States
- Language: English
- Website: LoftLifemag.com

LoftLife is an American magazine devoted to urban shelter and design. It was launched in May 2008 by Northeast-based equity firm Modern Holdings Inc.

The concept for LoftLife was originally envisioned by Modern Holdings and a group of MBA students at Vanderbilt University, including subsequent publisher Joe Resudek.

The original vision was that of magazine that would become the Loftstyle Guide to Life in the City. LoftLife's first issue was published in a run of 25,000 copies and was only distributed in the selected Atlanta, Georgia test market. LoftLife maintains a regional office in Atlanta's Grant Park neighborhood, but has its main offices in New York City's Chelsea neighborhood.
